Erik Gustaf Granfelt (17 November 1883 – 18 February 1962) was a Swedish gymnast  who competed at the 1908 Summer Olympics. He was part of the Swedish team, which was able to win the gold medal in the gymnastics men's team event in 1908.

At the 1906 Intercalated Games in Athens, he was a member of the Swedish tug of war team, which won the bronze medal. ''see Tug of war 1906

Erik Granfelt also played football (soccer) for AIK from Stockholm, with whom he won the Swedish Championship in 1901.

References

External links 
 
 
 AIK

1883 births
1962 deaths
Sportspeople from Stockholm
Swedish male artistic gymnasts
Swedish footballers
Tug of war competitors at the 1906 Intercalated Games
Gymnasts at the 1906 Intercalated Games
Gymnasts at the 1908 Summer Olympics
Olympic tug of war competitors of Sweden
Olympic gymnasts of Sweden
Olympic gold medalists for Sweden
Olympic bronze medalists for Sweden
Olympic medalists in gymnastics
Medalists at the 1908 Summer Olympics
Medalists at the 1906 Intercalated Games
Association footballers not categorized by position
19th-century Swedish people
20th-century Swedish people